The Ministry of Economics, Finance and Industrial and Digital Sovereignty (pronounced ), informally referred to as Bercy, is one of the most important ministries in the Government of France. Its minister is one of the most prominent cabinet members after the prime minister. The name of the ministry has changed over time; it has included the terms "economics", "industry", "finance" and "employment" throughout its history.

Responsibilities
The Minister of Economics and Finance oversees:
 the drafting of laws on taxation by exercising direct authority over the Tax Policy Board (Direction de la législation fiscale) of the General Directorate of Public Finances (Direction générale des Finances publiques), formerly the Department of Revenue (Direction générale des impôts);
 national funds and financial and economic system, especially with the Office of the Treasurer and Receiver General (Direction générale du Trésor or French Treasury), not to be confused with the Public Treasury (Trésor public), that is the Office of the Comptroller-General (Direction générale de la comptabilité publique) under the authority of the Minister of Public Action and Accounts);
 the development, regulation and control of economics including industry, tourism, small business, competition, and consumer security, and other matters excluding energy, industrial security, environmental affairs and transportations which are under the authority of the Ministry of Ecology;
 employment policies and career education.

The officeholder, who has authority on the financial assets of the state, the financial and economic national system and the taxation rules overall, also represents France in the Economic and Financial Affairs Council (ECOFIN).

Location

The Ministry of Economics and Finance is situated in Bercy, in the 12th arrondissement of Paris. The building it shares with the Ministry of Public Action and Accounts extends to the Seine, where there is an embarcadero with fast river boats for faster liaisons to other government agencies. It is also served by Paris Métro lines 6 and 14 at Bercy station.

The saying "the Bercy Fortress" (French: la forteresse de Bercy) refers to the ministry as a dark department with obscure civil servants, especially of high rank. This is emphasised by the impressive look of the building.

Organisation
Bruno Le Maire has been Minister of Economics and Finance since 2017. In the government of Prime Minister Jean Castex, he is assisted by three junior ministers: Olivier Dussopt as Minister for Public Accounts, Agnès Pannier-Runacher as Minister for Industry and Jean-Baptiste Lemoyne as Minister for Small and Medium-Sized Enterprises.

See also
 List of Finance Ministers of France
 Superintendent of Finances (1561–1661)
 Controller-General of Finances (1661–1791)

References

External links

 Composition of Government
 Common site of the two ministries
 French taxation site

Economy
 
France
Institut national de la statistique et des études économiques